The London Blue Devils are Junior "B" box lacrosse team from London, Ontario, Canada.  The Blue Devils play in the OLA Junior B Lacrosse League.  The Devils home games are played at Nichols Arena.

History

The Blue Devils have been a charter member of the OLA since 2003.  Success has not come easy for London in Junior "B", but every season has shown some improvement.  The Blue Devils made the playoffs for the first time in 2011.    The London Blue Devils entered the 2012 season  with a very competitive team and finished with franchise best 14 wins and 6 losses.   The Blue Devils were awarded 4 of the 6 Western Conference 2012 awards:

2012 Top Goaltender - Tyler Glebe

2012 Top Defender - Eric Guiltinan

2012 Most Sportsmanlike - Ian King

2012 Coaching Staff of Year - Jeff Williamson, Ian Gordon, William Byers, Darryl Van Slyke

2013 Most Sportsmanlike Player Western Conference Mike Rybka

2014 Most Sportsmanlike Player Western Conference Mike Rybka

Season-by-season results
Note: GP = Games played, W = Wins, L = Losses, T = Ties, Pts = Points, GF = Goals for, GA = Goals against

Playoff results

External links
Blue Devils Webpage
The Bible of Lacrosse
Unofficial OLA Page
Ontario Jr B Lacrosse League | OJBLL | Pointstreak Sites

Ontario Lacrosse Association teams
Sports teams in London, Ontario
Lacrosse clubs established in 2003
2003 establishments in Ontario